Pastime is the 18th Spenser novel by Robert B. Parker. The story follows Boston-based PI Spenser as he attempts to find a man's missing mother.

Plot
Spenser's semi-adopted son, Paul Giacomin, visits Spenser in Boston asking for his help. He can't locate his mother, who has apparently left on an extended trip without telling him. While Paul's mother is somewhat lacking in motherly skills, he doesn't believe she would voluntarily leave her home for such an extended period without contacting him.  Though Paul can't pay Spenser, he takes the case anyway as a favor to Paul.

Spenser takes Paul along in his sleuthing, introducing him as his "prentice", though Paul has no real intention of becoming a detective: he just wants to find his mother.

Recurring characters
 Spenser
 Paul Giacomin
 Hawk
 Dr. Susan Silverman, Ph.D
 Cpt. Martin Quirk, Boston Police Department
 Vinnie Morris
 Joe Broz
 Gerrie Broz
 Patty Giacomin

External links
 Page on the book from Parker's official website

1991 American novels
Spenser (novel series)
Novels set in Boston